Great Hits of 1965 is a studio album by Pat Boone, released in 1966 on Dot Records.

Track listing

References 

1966 albums
Pat Boone albums
Dot Records albums